Yeonmi Park (born 4 October 1993) is a North Korean defector and activist whose family fled from North Korea to China in 2007 and settled in South Korea in 2009, before moving to the United States in 2014. Her family turned to black-market trading during the North Korean famine in the 1990s. Her father was sent to a labor camp for smuggling. They fled to China, where Park and her mother fell into the hands of human traffickers and she was sold into slavery before escaping to Mongolia. She is now an advocate for victims of human trafficking in China and works to promote human rights in North Korea and around the globe.

Park came to wider global attention after giving a speech at the 2014 One Young World Summit—an annual summit that gathers young people from around the world to develop solutions to global problems—in Dublin, Ireland. Her speech, about her experience escaping from North Korea, received 50 million views in two days on YouTube and social media, with a current total of more than 100 million. Some commentators, as well as other North Korean defectors, have criticized Park's retellings of her story for having various inconsistencies, contradictory claims, and exaggerated accounts. She has attributed much of these discrepancies to imperfect memory and her limited English skills at the time of her original speech.

Park's memoir In Order to Live: A North Korean Girl's Journey to Freedom was published in September 2015. She runs the YouTube channel "Voice of North Korea by Yeonmi Park", a personal social media vlog covering North Korean news, politics, and culture. On 11 August 2022, Park announced that her second book, While Time Remains: A North Korean Defector's Search for Freedom in America, would be released on 14 February 2023.

Early life 
Park was born on 4 October 1993 in Hyesan, Ryanggang, North Korea. She has an older sister, Eun-mi, who was born in 1991. Her father, Park Jin-Sik, was a civil servant who worked at the Hyesan town hall as a member of the ruling Workers' Party of Korea, and her mother, Byeon Keum-sook, was a nurse for the Korean People's Army. Her paternal grandfather Park Chang-gyu, a former civil servant in the Japanese occupation, initially had a high  status after serving as a military officer in the Korean War, but her father's opportunities were limited after her uncle Park Dong-il was convicted for rape and attempted murder in 1980. Her father was unable to complete his military service at that time after suffering severe appendicitis. Meanwhile, her mother had a low  status because her ancestors had been landowners in North Hamgyong Province. After the Mukden incident her maternal grandfather Byeon Ung-rook had migrated to Hunchun, Manchukuo, and fought in an unknown faction of the Second Sino-Japanese War, but became stranded back in Onsong, Soviet-occupied North Korea, after losing two of his limbs in a railway accident. Her paternal grandmother Hwang Ok-soon also lost her leg in a 1952 U.S. air raid on Chongjin. Byeon Keun-sook graduated from college with a degree in inorganic chemistry. 

Her father, after finding employment at a foundry, decided to supplement his income by smuggling Chinese cigarettes, clothes, and rice. He met Byeon in Kowon in 1989 during one of his smuggling runs. He later established a metal smuggling operation in the capital, Pyongyang, where he spent most of the year with his mistress Wan Sun while his wife and daughters remained in Hyesan. Her family was wealthy by North Korean standards during most of her childhood. However, the family later struggled after her father's imprisonment in November 2002 for illegally trading salt, sugar, and other spices.

Escape from North Korea 
Park's father was sentenced to hard labor at the Chungsan reeducation camp in a show trial in 2004. Park claims that her views of the ruling Kim family changed when she watched an illegally imported DVD of the 1997 movie Titanic, which caused her to realize the "oppressive nature" of the North Korean government. She states that the movie taught her the true meaning of love and gave her "a taste of freedom". 

Her father's expulsion from the Workers' Party of Korea and their loss of income forced the Park sisters to stop going to school, and their living standards worsened. Park contracted a chronic case of pellagra because of malnutrition and allegedly resorted to eating dragonflies and cicadas to survive. In 2003 they moved to her mother's hometown of Kowon and Park was briefly sent to live with her aunt in the village of Songnam-ri. In 2005 her mother was arrested for a month for illegally changing her residence, but at that time her father was released from prison on sick leave after falsely promising the warden a large bribe. 

When reunited with his family, Park's father urged the family to plan their escape to China. Unfortunately, her older sister Eunmi left for China early without notifying them. Park and her family feared that they would be punished for Eunmi's escape, so they escaped North Korea by traveling through China with the help of brokers who smuggle North Koreans into China. Chinese and Korean Christian missionaries helped them relocate to Mongolia, and in 2009, South Korean diplomats facilitated the family's transition into Seoul. Park then became a full-time activist for North Korean human rights.

China 
Park and her family escaped North Korea by crossing the border into Changbai Korean Autonomous County, Jilin, China. On the night of 30 March 2007, with the aid of human traffickers, Park and her mother crossed the frozen Yalu River and three mountains into China. According to The Guardian and The Telegraph, Park's father was sick and stayed behind in North Korea, thinking his illness would slow them down. Several other speeches from Park suggested, however, that her father had joined them in the crossing to China. After crossing the border, Park and her mother headed for Jilin. They unsuccessfully tried to find Park's sister, Eunmi, asking the traffickers about her whereabouts. Park and her mother assumed that Eunmi had died. In October 2007, Park sent word to her father and arranged to smuggle him into China. There, he was diagnosed with inoperable colon cancer.

According to The Telegraph, while the family was living in secret, in January 2008 her father died. The family was unable to formally mourn him, fearing that they would be discovered by Chinese authorities, and buried his cremated remains in the ground of a nearby mountain. Park's mother told The Diplomat in 2014 that they had paid two people to help carry his body up the mountain for burial instead.

Park and her mother found a Christian shelter headed by Chinese and South Korean missionaries in Qingdao. Due to the city's large ethnic Korean population, they were able to evade the attention of authorities. With the help of the missionaries, they took a chance to flee to South Korea through Mongolia.

Mongolia 

In February 2009, after receiving aid from human rights activists and Christian missionaries, Park and her mother traveled through the Gobi Desert to Mongolia to seek asylum from South Korean diplomats.

When they reached the Mongolian border, General Authority for Border Protection guards stopped them and threatened to deport the pair back to China. Park recalls that at this point she and her mother pledged to kill themselves with their own razors. "I thought it was the end of my life. We were saying goodbye to one another." Their actions persuaded the guards to let them through, but they were placed under arrest and kept in custody at a detention center at Ulaanbaatar, the capital of Mongolia. Park later said in a podcast interview with Jordan Peterson that she believed the guards were toying with them since Mongolia's official policy on North Korean refugees is to deport them to South Korea. On 1 April 2009, Park and her mother were sent to Ulaanbaatar's Chinggis Khaan Airport to fly them to Seoul Incheon International Airport. Park felt relieved to be free at last; the Daily Telegraph reported, Oh my God,' she thought when Mongolian customs officials waved her through. 'They didn't stop me.

South Korea 

After receiving training at the South Korean Ministry of Unification's Hanawon Resettlement Center, Park and her mother settled in Asan. They had difficulty adjusting to their new lives in South Korea, but they managed to find jobs as shop assistants and waitresses. Despite arriving in South Korea with only a second-grade education, Park managed to achieve her high school equivalency after eighteen months of studying. She was admitted to Dongguk University in Seoul. In 2011, she was cast on the EBS television program Now On My Way to Meet You, a variety show featuring North Korean defectors. In April 2014, the South Korean National Intelligence Service informed Park that her sister, Eunmi, had escaped to South Korea via China and Thailand. Park and her mother eventually reunited with Eunmi.

United States 

Park first visited North America in 2013 with a Christian mission, going to Houston, Texas; San José, Costa Rica; and Atlanta, Georgia. Park moved to New York City in 2014 to complete her memoir while expanding her role as an activist. She published her memoir in 2015, where she shared her journey from defection to higher education. Park attended classes at Barnard College and then applied and was accepted to the Columbia University School of General Studies, starting there in the Fall 2016 semester. She majored in economics and graduated in 2020 with a Bachelor of Arts.

Activism 

Since escaping, Park has written and spoken publicly about her life in North Korea, has written for the Washington Post, and has been interviewed by The Guardian and for the Australian public affairs show Dateline. Park volunteers for such activist programs as the Freedom Factory Corporation, a free-market think tank in South Korea.

Park has also become a member of LiNK (Liberty in North Korea), a U.S. nonprofit organization that rescues North Korean refugees hiding in China and resettles them in South Korea and the United States. On 12 to 15 June 2014, Park attended LiNK's summit at Pepperdine University in Malibu, California. Park and North Korean activists Joo Yang and Seongmin Lee worked in sessions and labs, informing participants of conditions in North Korea and of how LiNK can support refugees from North Korea. Park took part in LiNK's campaign, the Jangmadang.

Park has also been outspoken about tourism in North Korea, as visitors are encouraged to bow to statues of Kim Jong-il and Kim Il-sung, which she sees as "[aiding] the regime's propaganda by allowing themselves to be portrayed as if they too love and obey the leader."

She was selected as one of the BBC 100 Women in 2014 and is a member of the Helena Group.

Park worked as a co-host for Casey Lartigue, a talk show host of the podcast-show North Korea Today. The podcast discusses North Korean topics and the lives of refugees after their escapes. Park volunteered for this opportunity to further her activism. Together, Lartigue and Park hosted five episodes of the podcast.

Park has told the story of her escape at several well-known events, including TEDx in Bath, the One Young World summit in Dublin, and the Oslo Freedom Forum.

At an 26 April 2021 speaking engagement at Texas Tech University, Park claimed that speech criticizing the North Korean Supreme Leader had become a crime in South Korea, possibly referring to South Korea's passing of an amendment to the "Inter-Korean Relations Development Act" prohibiting South Koreans from sending, amongst other things, anti-Pyongyang leaflets, auxiliary storage devices (e.g., USB drives), and money or other monetary benefits to North Korea.

Criticism 
Some commentators have noted inconsistencies in Park's stories about her life in North Korea. Mary Ann Jolley of The Diplomat has noted problems ranging from "serious inconsistencies" to contradictory refutations on several occasions. In an online update, Park claimed that many of the discrepancies in her stories came from her limited English skills in the past, adding that her "childhood memories were not perfect." 38 North has noted that some critics, including other North Korean refugees, have accused Park of embellishing her accounts or appropriating elements from others' escape stories.

Personal life 
Park was married to an American man named Ezekiel from 2017 to 2020; they had a son together.

Park was automatically granted South Korean citizenship after arriving in Seoul in 2009. Park is also a naturalized U.S. citizen.

Beliefs 
Park believes that there are positive and negative possibilities for North Korea to be reunified with South Korea. She believes that there are neither northerners nor southerners in Korea, just Koreans themselves.

Park believes that change might occur in North Korea as long as she and other North Korean defectors advocate for human rights there. According to the National Review, Park presumes that "the regime adjusts, as the Chinese Communists and the Vietnamese Communists have done. That would allow the North Korean Communists to hang on for untold years longer." Therefore, the Kims would be able to focus on their people, and then, they would be able to become more open to the world. Park also believes that the Jangmadang, the black market of North Korea, will transform or develop the country's society because it provides wide access to outside news media and information. According to Park, "If I ever return to a reformed North Korea, I will be thrilled to meet my peers as we attempt to bring wealth and freedom to people who were forced into poverty by the Kim family dynasty."

Park considers Kim Jong-un to be a "cruel" leader and has made various claims about him personally ordering the executions of dissidents.

Political views 
Park described her education at Columbia University as "forcing you to think the way they want you to think", citing examples such as being scolded for enjoying literature by Jane Austen. Park criticized political correctness at Columbia University, saying, "I thought America was different but I saw so many similarities to what I saw in North Korea that I started worrying," and added that "America is not free". She then said on Fox Business that "our education system is brainwashing our children to make them think that this country is racist and make them believe that they are victims. It’s time for us to fight back. Otherwise, it might be too late for us to bring the glory of this country back."

She believes the U.S. is a "tolerant country" and she criticized American track and field athlete Gwen Berry for turning away from the national anthem at the U.S. Olympic track and field trials for the 2020 Tokyo Olympics in protest of racial and social injustices. In the summer of 2020, during the George Floyd protests in Chicago, Park claims she and her son were attacked and robbed by three African-American women, while white bystanders prevented her from calling the police. Park described to Joe Rogan how she is "speaking out" and becoming "the enemy of the woke" when she claims one of the black women who robbed Park scolded her for equating her skin color to a thief. According to her, the white bystanders at their stores also agreed with them and did not come to her rescue. The police managed to apprehend one of the three alleged perpetrators, Lecretia Harris, who pleaded guilty to unlawful restraint but had the robbery charge dropped by prosecutors as part of her plea deal. However, among other discrepancies, CWBChicago reports that the perpetrators of the robbery alleged to have involved Park were in fact Lecretia Harris and another man, not three black women.

Bibliography

See also 
 List of North Korean defectors in South Korea
 North Korean defectors
 Human rights in North Korea
 Liberty in North Korea

References

External links 

 
 While They Watched (2015), documentary feature film starring Yeonmi Park
 Yeonmi Park's speech at the One Young World Conference (YouTube)
 Yeonmi Park's Ubben Lecture at DePauw University; 5 October 2015

North Korean defectors
Living people
1993 births
North Korean escapees
American human rights activists
North Korean human rights activists
South Korean human rights activists
Political repression in North Korea
BBC 100 Women
North Korean women activists
People from Ryanggang
American Christians
North Korean Christians
South Korean Christians
Converts to Christianity from atheism or agnosticism
Columbia University School of General Studies alumni
Dongguk University alumni
Barnard College alumni